Saint George, an unincorporated community located in the "Georgia Bend" of the St. Mary's River, is the southernmost named settlement in Georgia. It is in Charlton County, south of Folkston. In 2010, the  population of the St. George census county division (CCD) was 2,841. Most of this population is in the town of St. George, but the figure also includes rural areas not recognized by the Census Bureau, including communities like Moniac.  The ZIP Code for Saint George is 31562.

History
The Georgia General Assembly incorporated Saint George as a town in 1906. The town's municipal charter was repealed in 1924.

Education
Students from St. George and the surrounding rural areas attend St. George Elementary School of the Charlton County School District. It serves students in grades kindergarten through sixth. After sixth grade, students are taught at Bethune Middle School and Charlton County High School, both in Folkston.

See also

References

External links

Former municipalities in Georgia (U.S. state)
Unincorporated communities in Georgia (U.S. state)
Unincorporated communities in Charlton County, Georgia
Census county divisions